Afon Eigiau is a small river in the Carneddau mountains in Snowdonia, in north-west Wales, which flows down Cwm Eigiau and into Llyn Eigiau.

It is fed by smaller streams which flow down the slopes of neighbouring Foel Grach, Carnedd Llywelyn and Pen yr Helgi Du.

References

Caerhun
Dolgarrog
Rivers of Conwy County Borough
Rivers of Snowdonia